Lightning Speed is a 1928 American action film directed by Robert N. Bradbury and starring Bob Steele, Mary Mayberry and Barney Furey.

Synopsis
A journalist in love with the daughter of a state governor tries to prevent her being kidnapped by a notorious criminal, who plans to force her father to pardon his brother.

Cast
 Bob Steele as Jack 
 Mary Mayberry as Betty 
 Perry Murdock as Shorty 
 Barney Furey as Velvet 
 William Welsh as Governor

References

Bibliography
 Munden, Kenneth White. The American Film Institute Catalog of Motion Pictures Produced in the United States, Part 1. University of California Press, 1997.

External links

1928 films
1920s action films
American action films
American silent feature films
1920s English-language films
American black-and-white films
Films directed by Robert N. Bradbury
Film Booking Offices of America films
Silent action films
1920s American films